Bilohirsk Raion is one of the 25 regions of Crimea, currently occupied by  Russian Federation. Population: 

This landlocked region is situated in the foothills of the central Crimea. The raion's administrative centre is the historical town of Bilohirsk.

References

Raions of Crimea